Montaud is a former French commune of the Loire on the north west of the city of Saint-Étienne. It was created during the French revolution then included in Saint-Étienne in 1855.

History 
Monte Alto appears in 14th century texts. In the 19th century the commune saw industrial expansion in the form of coal mining and of ribbon-making. Sainte-Marie mine, atop Crêt de Montaud, was working until 1960.

About 1840 a railway was built to connect Châteaucreux to Montaud station for transporting coal. At this time a scythe factory gave work to around 500 employees and was the main place for under 14s to work.

Montaud was the birthplace of the composer Jules Massenet, at 4 place Marengo in 1842, whose father had set up a local scythe factory in 1838.

See also
Communes of the Loire department

References

Communes of Loire (department)